Allah Nazar Baloch, is a Baloch insurgent commander and a former student leader and gynecologist. He is the leader of the Balochistan Liberation Front, which is one of the most active Baloch armed groups in Balochistan.

Nazar Baloch was born on 2 October 1968 in a remote area in Awaran, called Mehi, Mashkay.

Militant activities 
In February 2002, Nazar Baloch founded Baloch Student Organisation-Azad (BSO-Azad) which  struggle against Pakistan. In 2003, he went underground to join separatist militants who were involved in armed conflict with Pakistan. He was arrested by law enforcement agencies on 25 March 2005 in Karachi city.

References

1968 births
Living people
People from Awaran District
Baloch Students Organization
Baloch politicians
Baloch militants
Baloch nationalists